The Shade Swamp Shelter is a historic rustic shelter on the north side United States Route 6, just east of New Britain Avenue in Farmington, Connecticut. Built in 1934 by a crew of the Civilian Conservation Corps (CCC), it is one of the state's finest examples of the CCC's Rustic architecture. It was listed on the National Register of Historic Places in 1986.

Description and history
The Shade Swamp Shelter is located in southwestern Farmington, a largely rural-suburban area. It stands at the southern end of the Shade Swamp Wildlife Management area, a  state-owned area bounded on the south by US 6, and the west by New Britain Avenue, with the Pequabuck River draining most of its swampland near its eastern edge. It stands adjacent to a small gravel parking area, which serves as a trailhead for a Blue-Blazed Trail into the area. It is a modest open post-and-beam log structure, with lattice framing at the corners and diagonal support braces. The interior floor is flagstone, with a rustic bench built around the perimeter. The roof is supported by log rafters and finished in wooden shingles; in a distinctive flourish, the interior ceiling is finished in white birch logs arranged in a chevron pattern.

The state began acquiring portions of Shade Swamp as a management area beginning in 1926. The shelter was built in 1934 by the Civilian Conservation Corps, as part of a trail-building program into the underutilized area. Despite its public location (it is visible from the road), the shelter remains in good condition, and the ceiling is a stylistic detail not seen in the state's other surviving CCC structures.

The structure is no longer standing, having collapsed sometime between 2021 and early 2022, but remnants of the stone floor exist at its site.

See also
National Register of Historic Places listings in Hartford County, Connecticut

References

Park buildings and structures on the National Register of Historic Places in Connecticut
Buildings and structures completed in 1934
Civilian Conservation Corps in Connecticut
Buildings and structures in Hartford County, Connecticut
Farmington, Connecticut
National Register of Historic Places in Hartford County, Connecticut
1934 establishments in Connecticut